Demirözü District is a district of Bayburt Province of Turkey. Its seat is the town Demirözü. Its area is 594 km2, and its population is 8,531 (2021).

Composition
There are two municipalities in Demirözü District:
 Demirözü
 Gökçedere

There are 26 villages in Demirözü District:

 Akyaka
 Bayrampaşa
 Beşpınar
 Çağıllı
 Çakırözü
 Çatalçeşme
 Çimentepe
 Damlıca
 Devetaşı
 Dikmetaş
 Elmalı
 Eymür
 Güçlü
 Güvercindere
 Işıkova
 Kalecik
 Karayaşmak
 Kavaklı
 Otlukbeli
 Petekli
 Pınarcık
 Serenli
 Yakupabdal
 Yazıbaşı
 Yelpınar
 Yukarıpınarlı

References

Districts of Bayburt Province